A number of ships have been named Euripides, including –

, wrecked in the Sea of Marmara
, An ocean liner built by Harland & Wolff for the Aberdeen Line 
, a Panamanian cargo ship in service 1967–69

Ship names